Leuconitocris sessensis is a species of beetle in the family Cerambycidae. It was described by Stephan von Breuning in 1956.

Subspecies
 Dirphya sessensis intermedia Breuning, 1976
 Dirphya sessensis katangensis Breuning, 1970
 Dirphya sessensis sessensis (Breuning, 1956)

References

Leuconitocris
Beetles described in 1956